1992–93 Eccellenza Friuli-Venezia Giulia was the 6th level of Italian football, and it was the highest one in this region.

This is the 1st season of Eccellenza, 16 clubs took part in:
 12 clubs come from Eccellenza 1991–92
 2 clubs were relegated from Interregionale 1991-92
 2 clubs were promoted from Prima Categoria Friuli-Venezia Giulia 1991–92.

Teams

Final table

 : Domestic cup winners

See also
Eccellenza Friuli – Venezia Giulia

External links
www.calciofvg.it

Sport in Friuli-Venezia Giulia
6
Eccellenza Friuli-Venezia Giulia